Blood Done Sign My Name is a 2010 American drama film written and directed by Jeb Stuart and starring Ricky Schroder, Omar Benson Miller, Michael Rooker, and Nate Parker. It is based on the autobiographical book Blood Done Sign My Name (2004) by historian Timothy Tyson.

Plot

In Oxford, North Carolina, the county seat of a tobacco district, a black Vietnam-era veteran is beaten in 1970 by three white men, and shot dead by one of them. An all-white jury acquitted the two defendants who were indicted. The plot focuses on two characters: a local African-American high-school teacher, recently returned to the town from college, who organizes the black community to march to the state capital to protest the unjust verdict; and a white minister, who loses much of his congregation because of his racially liberal views during the civil rights era.

Cast
Michael Rooker as Defense attorney Billy Watkins
Gattlin Griffith as Tim Tyson
Lee Norris as Roger Oakley
Susan Walters as Martha Tyson
Omar Benson Miller as Herman Cozart
Ricky Schroder as Vernon Tyson
Nick Searcy as Robert Teel
Emily Alyn Lind as Julie Tyson
Lela Rochon as Roseanna Allen
Darrin Dewitt Henson as Eddie McCoy
Nate Parker as Ben Chavis
Sandra Ellis Lafferty as Grandma Jessie
Rhoda Griffis as Isabel Taylor
Michael May as Gerald Teel

Reception
On review aggregator website Rotten Tomatoes, the film holds an approval rating of 52% based on 29 reviews, and an average rating of 5.8/10. The website's critical consensus reads, "Even among civil rights movies, Blood Done Sign My Name is remarkably earnest, but its big heart can't cover for the bland acting and TV-style melodrama that blunts the movie's impact." On Metacritic, the film has a weighted average score of 49 out of 100, based on 16 critics, indicating "mixed or average reviews".

A. O. Scott of The New York Times admired the film's ambitions, but said that "Mr. Stuart's evident desire to respect the truth of the story in all its details leaves him without a clear, emphatic dramatic structure."

See also
 Civil rights movement in popular culture

References

External links
 
 
 

2010 films
Civil rights movement in film
2010 drama films
Films with screenplays by Jeb Stuart
Films produced by Jeb Stuart
2010s English-language films